J & G Cowlishaw (1876—) was an architectural partnership  in Brisbane, Queensland, Australia.

History
The partnership J & G Cowlishaw consisted of two architects and brothers James Cowlishaw and George Cowlishaw, sons of Sydney architect and contractor Thomas Cowlishaw. James's other business interests reduced his involvement in architecture over time and appears to have terminated , although George continued the practice into the early 1890s.

References

Architects from Brisbane
1876 establishments in Australia